Vivianne Härri (born 8 September 1999) is a Swiss alpine skier.

Career
During her career she has achieved one result among the top 15 in the FIS Alpine Ski World Cup.

World Cup results
Top 15

References

External links
 

1999 births
Living people
Swiss female alpine skiers